Ricardo Luz Araújo is a Brazilian footballer who plays as a right-back for Mirassol.

He has previously represented Villa Nova in 2015 Campeonato Brasileiro Série D and 2016 Campeonato Brasileiro Série D and played for a number of lower division clubs in Campeonato Mineiro.

Honours

Remo
Campeonato Paraense: 2022

References

External links
 

Living people
1995 births
Brazilian footballers
Association football defenders
Villa Nova Atlético Clube players
Democrata Futebol Clube players
Guarani Esporte Clube (MG) players
Atlético Clube Goianiense players
Araxá Esporte Clube players
Grêmio Esportivo Brasil players
Campeonato Brasileiro Série B players
Campeonato Brasileiro Série D players